Lahore is the second-largest city in Pakistan. There are both public and private well-established hospitals operating in Lahore, Pakistan. The list of hospitals located in Lahore, Pakistan consists of the following hospitals:

Private Hospitals 
The list of private hospitals operating in Lahore, Pakistan includes the following hospitals.
 National Eye Center (11-A, Sanda Road, Near MAO College Lahore)
 Rashid Hospital (D.H.A Lahore)
Bahria International Hospital
Salam Medical Complex
Doctors Hospital
Farooq Hospital
Fatima Memorial Hospital
Haleema Memorial Foundation Hospital
Ittefaq Hospital
 Mid City Hospital, Lahore
Shalamar Hospital (Institute of Health Sciences)
Shaukat Khanum Memorial Cancer Hospital & Research Centre
Ghurki Trust Teaching Hospital, Lahore
Surgimed Hospital
University Dental Hospital - University of Lahore
University Teaching Hospital - University of Lahore
Institute Cosmetique
 Railway Hospital - Rawalpindi

Military hospitals
Combined Military Hospital Lahore

Semi-private hospitals
Gulab Devi Chest Hospital
Shaikh Zayed Hospital Lahore
Data Darbar Hospital Lahore

Public hospitals
Following are some of the public hospitals that are operating in Lahore, Pakistan. These hospitals are providing high quality medical services at cheaper rate, to the people of Pakistan.

 Govt. teaching Hospital Shahdara, Lahore City, Lahore
Govt. TB (Tuberculosis) Hospital, Bilal Gunj, Lahore
 Govt. Mozang Teaching Hospital, Lahore City, Lahore
United Christian Hospital, Lahore
The Children's Hospital & Institute of Child Health
Jinnah Hospital
Lady Aitchison Hospital
Lady Willingdon Hospital 
Lahore General Hospital
Mayo Hospital
Mian Munshi DHQ-1 Teaching Hospital, Lahore City, Lahore
Nawaz Sharif Social Security Hospital, Multan Road
Nawaz Sharif Hospital Kot Khawja Saeed Lahore.
Pakistan Kidney and Liver Institute and Research Center, Lahore, Pakistan
Punjab Institute of Cardiology
Punjab Social Security Hospital
Punjab Institute of Neurosciences Ferozepur Road Lahore.
Punjab Dental Hospital, Lahore City, Lahore
Railway Karen Hospital
Said Mitha Hospital, Lahore City, Lahore
Services Hospital 
Services Institute of Medical Sciences
Social Security Hospital, Kotlakhpat, Ferozpur Road, Lahore
Punjab Institute of Mental Health
Sir Ganga Ram Hospital
Janki Devi Hospital
Jinnah Burn and Reconstructive Surgery Center, Allama Iqbal Medical College, Lahore
Wapda Hospital

References

External links
 All Hospitals in Lahore

Lahore
Lahore
Hospitals